Phong Thạnh may refer to several places in Vietnam, including:

Phong Thạnh, Bạc Liêu, a rural commune of Giá Rai
, a rural commune of Cầu Kè District